Domien de Waghemakere, or Dominikus (ca. 1460 – 1542), was a Flemish architect and an important exponent of Brabantine Gothic.

Biography
Between 1521 and 1530 he completed the tower of the Antwerp Cathedral with a Gothic-flamboyant spire. Between 1502 and 1542 he worked on and completed the St. James' Church in Antwerp; from 1514 to 1529 he is thought to have contributed to the St. Andrew's Church, also in Antwerp. Between 1525 and 1540 he collaborated again with Keldermans, on Hoogstraten Castle.

References

Year of birth unknown
1542 deaths
Gothic architects
Architects of the Habsburg Netherlands
People from Antwerp